Lubbockichthys tanakai is a species of fish in the family Pseudochromidae.

Description

Distribution and habitat
Lubbockichthys tanakai is found throughout the Northwest Pacific. From the Ryukyu Islands throughout Japan, into the Philippines and Indonesia.

Etymology
The Dottyback was named in honor of Hiroyuki Tanaka, who provided color slides and a paratype of the species. As an aquarist, he was first to point out this species.

References

Eschmeyer, W.N. (ed.), 2003. Catalog of fishes. Updated database version of March 2003. Catalog databases as made available to FishBase in March 2003. 

Pseudoplesiopinae
Taxa named by Anthony C. Gill
Taxa named by Hiroshi Senou
Fish described in 2002